Andrew "Ender" Wiggin is a fictional character from Orson Scott Card's 1985 science fiction novel Ender's Game and its sequels (Speaker for the Dead, Xenocide, Children of the Mind, Ender in Exile), as well as in the first part of the spin-off series, Ender's Shadow. The book series itself is an expansion, with some changes to detail, of Card's 1977 short story "Ender's Game."

In the 2013 film adaptation of Ender's Game, Ender is portrayed by Asa Butterfield.

Ender's Game
In the first book of the series, Ender's Game, Ender is the youngest and most well rounded of three children; his parents received permission to have a third child, which is rare in the state's strict two-child policy. His existence was called for by a program aiming at producing commanders for humanity's war against the Formics, or "Buggers." He attends Battle School, an Earth-orbiting space station that trains similar prodigies. He receives the same education as other children, but the military recognizes him as their best bet to be supreme commander and often manipulates its own rules to make sure Ender has the necessary technical skills and the right character for their ends. Expressly, Ender is conditioned to be entirely self-sufficient from a very young age.

As a child, Ender is bullied at school for being a "Third," particularly by a bully named Stilson. After Stilson engages him in a fight, Ender beats him up so severely that the boy is hospitalized and subsequently dies, although he is not aware of this fact until much later. Ender is tormented by his brother Peter, a sadist who delights in killing small animals and tormenting other children, and who resents the attention Ender gets from the military. His only refuge is with his beloved sister, Valentine, his protector and only friend. When he is accepted into Battle School, he is brokenhearted at leaving her, but she assures him that they will always have a bond.

At Battle School, Ender is exposed to significant emotional and mental anguish and even physical danger. The administration is forbidden from protecting him from harm, guaranteeing that he would never look to anybody else for help.

Ender breezes through academics, his main interest being the centerpiece of the school: a team-based three-dimensional laser tag competition in the zero-g Battle Room. He becomes a masterful player, then a masterful strategist, and is eventually assigned command of Dragon Army. He molds the group of untested and unwanted students into the most successful army in the history of the school (it is revealed in Ender's Shadow that Julian "Bean" Delphiki chose them).

Ender's unprecedented success arouses his fellow commanders' jealousy, who subject him to steadily worse torment. The lead bully, Bonzo, confronts Ender in the shower and attempts to kill Ender, but fails. Ender, driven to defend himself because of the administration's lack of intervention, kills Bonzo to end the conflict but does not know it. This reinforces Ender's recurring role as the ender of conflict, a personality trait favored by the administration. After the fight, they let Ender graduate from Battle School, never informing him that Bonzo died from his injuries.

After graduating several years ahead of schedule, he is transferred to Command School on Eros. There he trains in interstellar fleet combat with holographic simulators. After Ender masters the game under ordinary conditions, the game changes from one with direct control of ships to one where he relays commands to his friends and associates from Battle School: Julian "Bean" Delphiki, Alai, Shen, Petra Arkanian, Dink Meeker, Crazy Tom, Hot Soup, Fly Molo, Vlad, Dumper, and Carn Carby. Under the tutelage of Mazer Rackham, the legendary savior of humanity from the previous war, Ender and his trusted companions take on a grueling series of battles and emerge victorious each time, although the mounting pressure pushes Ender to the edge.

The final battle takes place above a planet made by the simulator at command school. The fight is against an enemy with overwhelming numerical superiority. Ender perceives this as a grossly unfair test and resolves to win by breaking the rules. This, he thinks, would convince his instructors that he is not the man to lead the Fleet into battle with the Formics. Instead of fighting the enemy ship-to-ship, Ender penetrates their defensive perimeter and destroys the planet itself. Not until after the pandemonium that follows is he told that it was not a simulation: Instead of taking on Rackham in what they had thought was a long series of simulations, he and his classmates had been unknowingly issuing orders to real ships in real combat. The final battle consisted of the destruction of the Bugger homeworld and the apparent eradication of the Bugger species. Ender is hailed as a hero, but he is stricken with guilt for having unknowingly committed genocide.

Valentine informs him that in the wake of the war, he would never be allowed to return to Earth due to her actions to protect him from Peter, who was becoming a major political force on Earth. He journeys with her to one of the colonies being established on the now-abandoned Bugger worlds. Once there, he discovers a fertilized pupa of a Queen Bugger, hidden in a place that the Buggers designed for him to discover by modeling it to resemble part of an interactive computer game he played during his years in the Battle School. The buggers find out about it during his tormented dreams of them in Command School. The pupal Queen is capable of continuing the Bugger race. Through rudimentary telepathic communication with the Queen, he learned what he had begun to suspect before the war's end: The entire conflict had been a mistake, resulting from the inability of two alien species to communicate. He also learns from the Queen that the Buggers had regretted having mistakenly fought humans and forgiven Ender for destroying their world. Empathizing with the Queen, Ender promises to find her a home to grow where the humans would not annihilate the Buggers.

To foster this eventual rebirth, Ender writes a book called The Hive Queen, which tells the story of the war from the Formic perspective. Ender uses the pseudonym Speaker for the Dead to author it. When Peter, who has advanced to the position of Hegemon of Earth, contacts him, the Speaker for the Dead, he writes a second novel, The Hegemon, a human parallel to the first book. The two are combined by popular culture, eventually becoming one of the founding texts of a quasi-religious practice on Earth's colonies. After writing the book, Ender and Valentine depart in a ship in an attempt to find a planet that would allow the Queen to grow and call their new home.

Speaker for the Dead
Speaker for the Dead begins 3000 years after the events of Ender's Game and the Xenocide. Ender is departing the planet where his sister Valentine has found a husband. He has also acquired an integrated computer by which he communicates with a powerful artificial intelligence known as Jane. Her existence is known only to Ender. He has taken the role of a Speaker for the Dead, keeping his identity as "Ender the Xenocide", who orchestrated the victory over the Formics, a secret. His books, "The Hive Queen" and "The Hegemon", in which he "spoke" for the dead Formics, was a self-critical work that was intended to portray Ender as a heartless monster who destroyed a sentient race. The name "Ender" is now considered an evil insult.

Ender departs for the planet Lusitania, where a request has been made to "speak" on behalf of a researcher who has died from contact with the planet's indigenous species, the piggies. When he arrives at the planet 22 years later (relativity having aged him only slightly; less than two weeks) he finds that the original call for a Speaker has been rescinded. Two other requests, however, have been made to "speak" for more recent deaths. Ender discovers that both calls originated from the same family; the first from Novinha's daughter Ela requesting someone speak for the death of Novinha's husband Marcos, and the second from her eldest son Miro, who has asked for a speaker for the researcher Libo.

Ender begins to investigate the Marcos figure and has frequent contact with Novinha's family. His honest and open approach endears him to most of the children as a father figure. He discovers that Marcos was abusive to his wife. With the help of Jane and his connection with the children, he uncovers multiple secrets that have been hidden for years. However, while in dialogue with the Children of the Mind, the planet's religious monastic order, he is annoyed by Jane's semi-sarcastic commentary and turns off his connection to her, something he has never done before. The resulting complete isolation and trauma of Jane is the unforeseen result. Jane, without consulting Ender, sends incriminating reports to the interstellar authorities who order the arrest of Miro and Ouanda, the researchers and lovers who have been investigating the piggies. The colony's charter is canceled, and the colonists are forced to rely on Ender for guidance.

Meanwhile, Ender has been receiving pressure from the Hive-Queen's pupa to allow her to settle on this world because she has been in telepathic contact with another race. Ender assumes this race is the piggies, although the bipedal life forms that are the primary contacts of Miro and Ouanda seem very simple and not telepathic at all. After the sanctions are put in place, he gets Miro and Ouanda to allow him to visit the piggies, who have been asking to meet him, the 'original Speaker' (a claim Miro and Ouanda have been dismissing as a misunderstanding). Ender reverts many of the researchers' assumptions when he not only admits to being the original Speaker, but has the piggies demonstrate that the trees the piggies grow from the corpses of those who have been ritually killed is the third, reproductive stage. The ritual killings of the two xenologers were misunderstandings. The piggies were under the false impression that humans reproduced in a fashion similar to themselves.

After these revelations, Ender proceeds to "speak" for Marcos and revealed many secrets hitherto hidden, mostly by Novinha. Foremost among them was that Marcos was incapable of having children, and Novinha's children are offspring of Libo. This is devastating news to Miro, because it means his girlfriend Ouanda is his half-sister. Sanctions from the Intergalactic Congress are learned of and Ender recommends that the colony declare itself in rebellion. He re-establishes contact with Jane who masks their ansible signal.

He enters into the beginnings of a relationship with Novinha. His sister, Valentine, agrees to travel to the colony. On the far side of the planet, he has discovered a site reminiscent of a dream in Enders Game. With her guidance, he plants the Hive-Queen's pupa in preparation for the rebirth of the Formics after 3000 years.

Xenocide
During Xenocide, Ender is looked to as an unofficial leader for the multiple efforts being undertaken in the rebel Colony of Lusitania. He is helping as much as he can with Novinha's work in protecting humans from the descolada virus. The Descolada is fatal to humans, but is essential for the piggies' life and reproduction. The Formics have an immune system that is advanced enough to protect them, and the humans have been using anti-viral dietary supplements, but both defenses are starting to fade in effectiveness in the face of the virus' rampant mutations. Ender is also attempting to keep the peace on planet among the three species where resentment is brewing. The humans are starting to resent the piggies for being the reason they can't just kill the descolada outright. The existence of the new Formic colony is not general knowledge, but Ender knows that their appearance and their non-human way of reasoning would cause friction with the humans. Particularly troublesome are Novinha's two youngest children; Grego, who is something of a rabble-rouser among the humans, and Quara, who sees the virus as sentient and is bringing up problematic objections to the research her mother and sister are doing. The piggies and the Formics are also worried about the approaching human fleet, which may destroy the planet if the threat of the descolada virus is unleashed on humanity.

Eventually, research ordered by the government on another planet, Path, leads a young genius girl, Han Qing-jao, to deduce the existence of Jane, who is inextricably tied to the ansible system. Jane reveals herself to Qing-jao in an effort to prevent her from informing the authorities by telling her that the OCD her people suffer from was governmentally ordered and orchestrated, a plea which the girl's father Han Fei-tzu and handmaiden Si Wang-mu agree with. However, the report to the authorities is dispatched regardless and the government enacts a plan to temporarily deactivate the ansible network to purge Jane from the system. 
The father agrees to help with the Descolada problem regardless of his daughter's actions, in exchange for a cure for the pervasive OCD that plagues them. The Lusitanian researchers agree, but though a cure for both is designed, it proves impossible to synthesize; they can't cure the OCD without removing the genius as well, and the counter for the descolada simply won't be created. Meanwhile, putting together facts about Jane's origins, the ansible, and philotes, the irreducible building blocks of all matter everywhere, they deduce that Jane has the power to take any object she knows about in great detail and pull it outside the known universe, an area where conscious thought has physical power.

Ender goes on the first test flight because Jane's existence was a direct result of his time at the Battle School, where the buggers established a connection with him via a computer simulation game; therefore, Jane is most likely to be able to keep Ender's form in her mind. Since Ender has all but passed Jane off to Miro at this point, due to the previous misunderstanding in Speaker, he must go as well. Ela goes because she is the only one with enough knowledge to produce the needed viruses. The test flight occurs with unexpected side-effects. Ela produces the new viruses, but Miro also gives himself a new body, undamaged unlike his old one. Ender, however, inadvertently creates copies of his brother and sister from his memories. They are more based on those memories than reality; therefore, Valentine is very soft and loving, and Peter is almost pure evil and malice. Horrified at what he has created, Ender removes himself from further efforts, as they will all need to involve the instantaneous travel Jane can do by moving things outside and Ender will not risk creating more things like his pseudo-siblings.

Children of the Mind
Children of the Mind begins where Xenocide left off. Much of Ender's story revolves around his "pseudo-offspring" Peter and young Val. After Ender's first and only trip to the outside and back inside, Ender creates Peter and young Val from his aiua. Ender's "life force" is now split between three different people. Throughout the book Ender has a difficult time maintaining an aiua strong enough for all three people to live. The maximum number of people Ender can keep alive and healthy at any given time is two. In the beginning young Val suffers the most because Ender is the least interested in her mission, until it is revealed that she, along with Miro and Jane, are looking for the home planet of the descolada virus. Peter never had to compete for Ender's aiua because Ender was always interested in Peter's mission to prevent the Lusitania fleet from using the Molecular Disruption Device on Lusitania. Now that Ender's aiua is fully invested in Peter and young Val, Ender himself begins to deteriorate. This causes Ender to collapse while working in the monastery garden, falling in and out of consciousness for the remainder of the book until his death. Ender's physical manifestation is gone, but his aiua continues through Peter (young Val gives up her physical manifestation as well for Jane and her aiua continues through Peter as well).

Ender in Exile
A book that chronicles the 'lost years' between Ender's Game and Speaker for the Dead, Ender in Exile tells of Ender's initial set-off from Eros, the long journey to the first colony, Shakespeare, as well as his trip to the Indian-dominant colony of Ganges, where Ender encounters a familiar, yet not-so-familiar face. The court martial of Hyrum Graff is expanded upon; some light is shed on Graff's life after he was made Minister of Colonization, as well as Mazer Rackham's travels after the Formic War.

After defeating the Formics, Ender remains on Eros. Peter, under his alias of Locke, has quelled the warring nations and has implemented a temporary truce. Valentine no longer wishes to be a part of Peter's quest to rule the world. She pleads with her parents to come along with her and Ender to the planet colony of Shakespeare. They decline.  Alessandra and her mother, Dorabella, sign-up to go to Shakespeare to get away from Dorabella's mother and money problems. They had planned to be put into stasis during the two-year voyage, but several complications occurred and instead they remain awake. Along with the crew of Ender, Valentine, Admiral Quincy Morgan (the captain) and some other colonists who opted against stasis.

Throughout the voyage, Ender has a battle of wills with Admiral Morgan, who attempts to usurp Ender's lawful position as Governor of Shakespeare. Morgan sees Ender to be a foolish child that no one would follow. During the voyage, Dorabella seduces Admiral Morgan and tries to use her daughter, Alessandra, to seduce Ender hoping that, through her own marriage to Morgan and Alessandras' successful marrying of Ender, Morgan could rule Shakespeare using Ender as a puppet.

Upon arrival at Shakespeare, Ender quickly and easily crushes Morgan's attempted bloodless coup, with a little help from Minister of Colonization Hyrum Graff back on Earth. Ender then successfully liberates Alessandra from her dominating mother. After two years as governor, and completing 'The Hive Queen and the Hegemon', Ender convinces Valentine to move on.

Ender's first stop, at the request of Hyrum Graff, is the Hindu colony of Ganges which is governed by Virlomi, a former battle school student who caused an uprising in India before she was subdued and exiled by Peter Wiggin's Hegemony. Once there, Ender agrees to help Virlomi quell an uprising by a group called 'The Natives of Ganges', led by an angry young man named Randall Firth under the delusion that he is the son of Achilles de Flandres. The so-called 'natives' have adopted 'The Hive Queen' as a rallying cry, and have begun to belittle the name of war hero Ender Wiggin coining the phrase 'Ender the Xenocide'.
 
Ender and Randall have a physical combat leaving Ender near death. Ender reveals Randall's true parentage (two of Ender's old friends and squadron commanders, Julian 'Bean' Delphiki and Petra Arkanian Delphiki Wiggin), after which Randall renounces his secret name, Achilles, and renames himself Arkanian Delphiki. Shortly after, Ender reunites Randall and his true mother by way of the ansible.

References

External links
 Original "Ender's Game" short story
 Ender's Game page on Card's website with link to first chapter
 Ender Saga

Characters in American novels of the 20th century
Characters in American novels of the 21st century
Characters in short stories
Child characters in comics
Child characters in literature
Male characters in literature
Male characters in film
Child characters in film
Ender's Game series characters
Fictional characters from North Carolina
Ender Wiggin
Fictional child soldiers
Fictional priests and priestesses
Fictional admirals
Fictional genocide perpetrators
Fictional Polish-American people